Ali Juma Haji is a Tanzanian CCM politician and Member of Parliament for Chaani constituency since 2000.

References

Living people
Tanzanian Muslims
Chama Cha Mapinduzi MPs
Tanzanian MPs 2010–2015
Year of birth missing (living people)